Lirim is a predominantly Albanian language masculine given name. Notable people bearing the name Lirim include:

Lirim Hajrullahu (born 1990), Kosovan-Canadian gridiron football player
Lirim Kastrati (footballer, born January 1999), Albanian footballer
Lirim Kastrati (footballer, born February 1999), Albanian footballer
Lirim Mema (born 1998), Kosovan footballer
Lirim Qamili (born 1998), Albanian footballer
Lirim Zendeli (born 1999), German racing driver

Masculine given names
Albanian masculine given names